Bakkehaugen Church is a church, located in the neighborhood of Tåsen in Oslo, Norway.  

In 1938, an architectural competition was announced. This was won by architect Ove Bang.  The construction of the church was delayed due to World War II and lack of funding.  The winning draft was reworked by architect Erling Viksjø before his death in 1942. The construction of the church started in the late 1950s. The church was consecrated by bishop Johannes Smemo on December 20, 1959.

The church building has been awarded the architectural prize Betongtavlen for outstanding construction in concrete.  The building is a typical representative of its time.

The church is built in natural concrete and has a boathouse shape (Triangle). It has a freestanding bell tower. The facility also houses offices and parish halls. The church was somewhat expanded in 1994, and the church gained new copper roofs in 1999.

The decorations in the church room are done by Kai Fjell og Carl Nesjar.

The church is listed by the Norwegian Directorate for Cultural Heritage and protected by Norwegian law.

References

External links
 Velkommen til Bakkehaugen, Majorstuen og Vestre Aker kirker Parish Website (in Norwegian)

Lutheran churches in Oslo
Churches completed in 1959
1959 establishments in Norway
20th-century Church of Norway church buildings